Ngai-Ling Sum (born 1952) is a British sociologist and political economist and co-director of the Cultural Political Economy Research Centre at Lancaster University.

Career 
Her 2006 book Beyond the Regulation Approach. Putting Capitalist Economies in their Place (co-authored with Bob Jessop) was awarded the Gunnar Myrdal Prize awarded given by the European Association for Evolutionary Political Economy. Geografiska Annaler called the book a good introduction to the theory of Regulation Approach. Sum's contributions to the book were considered "central in pushing its boundaries to the emerging project of cultural political economy" by Ray Hudson in Economic Geography.

She also was awarded a British Academy BARDA Award in 2008 for her work with Jessop on Changing Cultures of Competitiveness: A Cultural Political Economy Approach. Her work has appeared in several academic journals like Competition & Change, Urban Studies, New Political Economy, Critical Policy Studies, Critical Asian Studies, Economy and Society, and Capital & Class, among others.

Major works

  
 Beyond the Regulation Approach. Putting Capitalist Economies in their Place (co-authored with Bob Jessop) Cheltenham: Edward Elgar 2006.
 Towards A Cultural Political Economy. Putting Culture in its Place in Political Economy (co-authored with Bob Jessop) Cheltenham: Edward Elgar 2014.

References

External links 
 Ngai-Ling Sum's homepage at University of Lancaster

1952 births
Living people
Academics of Lancaster University
British sociologists
British women sociologists